Jackson Hawke was a Canadian pop rock band, principally active during 1976-1978 and most notable for its song "You Can't Dance", which became an international hit for England Dan and John Ford Coley.

History 
Jackson Hawke was co-founded in 1974 by Tim Ryan and Bob Yeomans.  The two had originally begun working together as professional musicians in 1963 and had earlier been managed by noted Canadian manager, promoter and record producer Bernie Finkelstein.  Ryan and Yeomans, originally from Sault Ste. Marie, Ontario, had been in an early Canadian garage band, The Amen.

In addition to Ryan on lead vocals and guitar and Yeomans on guitar, the original lineup of Jackson Hawke was completed by Gene Falbo on bass and Chris Castle on drums. Later guitarists were Garry Holt & JP Hawkins.  Later drummers were Bob Clarke (previously with Ryan and Yeomans in The Amen) and Bucky Berger. Jackson Hawke was particularly prominent in Canada during the 1976-1978 period, releasing three singles and two albums on CBS Records.  They were at one time associated with Canadian publicist and entertainment manager Gino Empry.

Their first single, released in 1976, was a double-sided hit, featuring the original "You Can't Dance" and a version of Van Morrison's "Into The Mystic". "You Can't Dance" later became an international hit when released in 1978 by England Dan and John Ford Coley.  The song was also covered and released as a successful single by Ricky Nelson. The band's 1977 single, "Set Me Free", peaked at number 54 in Canada, but went to number 11 on the CHUM Chart in Toronto.

Tim Ryan developed a solo career both before and after Jackson Hawke. In 1973, he represented Canada in the Tokyo for the World song festival. In 1984, he was nominated for a Juno Award as "Most Promising Male Vocalist of The Year".  He also developed a successful career singing commercial jingles.

In December, 2007, both The Amen and Jackson Hawke reunited for the "18 Forever" festival in Sault Ste. Marie, commemorating the musicians who had originally gained fame in Sault Ste. Marie in the 1960s, which is regarded as a seminal period in that city's music history.

Tim Ryan died in Toronto on June 2, 2016, at the age of 67, following heart surgery.
Bob Yeomans died in Sault Ste Marie on January 22, 2022.

Discography 
 1976 Forever (CBS)
 1977 Jackson Hawke (CBS)

References 
Notes

Citations

Musical groups established in 1974
Musical groups disestablished in 1978
Musical groups from Sault Ste. Marie, Ontario
Canadian pop music groups
1974 establishments in Ontario
1978 disestablishments in Ontario
Columbia Records artists